action drama film written and directed by M. Muthaiah. Produced by Suriya under 2D Entertainment, the film stars Karthi and debutante Aditi Shankar. Yuvan Shankar Raja composed the music with cinematography by Selvakumar S. K. It was released theatrically on 12 August 2022 and emerged as a commercial success at the box office.

Plot 
Muniyandi is a narcissistic man who cares about his reputation and money, and who would go to any extent to get what he wants. His sister Dhanam and Balu are in love with each other, which Muniyandi disapproves. Dhanam poisons herself and tells him that she will get married if he takes her to the hospital, but Muniyandi leaves her to die and also treats his wife Muthulakshmi poorly. Muthulakshmi finds out that her husband is having an affair, and Muniyandi tells her to put up with it. Because of the way Muniyandi treats her and her family, Muthulakshmi burns herself to death, which her young son Viruman witnesses. Enraged, Viruman chases his father with an aruva into the court. When the court advises him not to kill Muniyandi, Viruman tells that he does not want to live with him and wants to be raised by his uncles Niraipandian and Balu. 

Years later, tension and rivalry always grows between Viruman and Muniyandi, which bothers other people, specifically Viruman's brothers - Selvam, Muthukutty and Ilango. Out of respect, Viruman takes any criticism and disrespect from his brothers because he respects them. Meanwhile, Thaenmozhi "Theanu", who is Selvam's sister-in-law, praises Muniyandi due to the fact he is her sister's father-in-law and hates Viruman. However, Viruman is in love with her. When the family has a fight, she publicly defends Muniyandi. Meanwhile, Selvam needs a job and wants his father's help, which he rejects. Viruman helps him get a job with the help of MLA Pathinettaampadiyan, who forts a condition to sell his mother's land, which Viruman has always refused to sign for years but finally does so for the sake of his brothers. Thaenu realizes this and starts to reciprocate his feelings. 

Their relationship is caught by Muniyandi, who starts to disrespect her and asks her to pay for the remaining dowry from her sister's marriage. While the whole village is getting involved with Selvam and Muniyandi, Viruman tells him to stop co-depending on his father as he has his own family to focus on. Selvam agrees and decides to live independently from his father. This enrages Muniyandi, who wants to fight Viruman, but Thaenu kisses Viruman, which shocks everyone. Muthukutty wants his father to sign for the auction for the restaurant, which his father rejects. His wife suggests to ask Viruman, which he is hesitant at first but later accepts. When Muniyandi finds out, he asks the village rogue Soonapaana, who slapped him, to make Muthukutty lose the auction. When the auction happens, Viruman realizes that his father has hired Soonapaana and decides to trap him. He makes his gang chase him, and Viruman locks them up. 

Muthukutty ends up getting the auction for the restaurant. Soonapaana and his gang arrive and disrespect the staff. When Soonapaana raises his hand and Muthukutty, it is stopped by Viruman and a fight ensues. Viruman beats up Soonapaana and his gang, which leads to them being at the hospital. Muniyandi is mad at them and brings sarees to imply that they are women. Angered, Soonapaana vows to get the son and father killed. While Viruman and Thaenu are on their date, they encounter Ilango with his girlfriend. She turns out to be Pathinettaampadiyan's daughter, and they have been dating for four years. Viruman asks him whether he told their father and he says no. Viruman comes up with a plan that Ilango should slap Viruman, which would make his father happy and proud of Ilango and then bring up his relationship. The plan is done. 

Muniyandi accepts and says that he will ask Pathinettaampadiyan; however, Pathinettaampadiyan rejects the idea. When Viruman arrives, Pathinettaampadiyan reveals that he actually wanted Viruman's approval rather than Muniyandi's, which enrages Muniyandi. He says to cancel Ilango's marriage proposal, but Ilango reveals that he is done with his father and leaves. Meanwhile, Muniyandi's brother Kuthalam Thevar and his son Sembadayan decide to kill Viruman. Sembadayan lies to his cousin Viruman saying they need his help to fix a marquee for a funeral. When Viruman visits, a fight ensues. Muniyandi witnesses this, and Viruman knows it was not the former's idea because he would have arrived earlier. It turns out that Kuthalam wanted to kill Muniyandi and put the blame on Viruman because he wants his brother's money. Muniyandi arrives home and is mad at everyone for leaving him. He drinks alcohol and faints, where he is sent to the hospital. 

It turns out that Muniyandi has kidney failure due to his alcoholism and needs a donor. Viruman's paternal grandmother tells him that his father is in the hospital. Muniyandi's kidney transplant is successful, and it turns out that Balu has donated his kidney to him. While everyone is asleep, he leaves to visit his wife's old home. While he is there, Soonapaana and his gang arrive and try to burn his house. Viruman arrives and starts to attack his gang, when he also realizes his father is there and saves him. Muniyandi tells Viruman to leave him there because he feels guilty for Muthulakshmi and his sister's death, and apologizes for his actions. Viruman forgives him, and they reconcile.

Cast 

 Karthi as Viruman
 Aditi Shankar as Thaenmozhi (Thaenu), Viruman's love interest
 Prakash Raj as Muniyandi, Viruman's father 
 Saranya Ponvannan as Muthulakshmi, Viruman's mother 
 Rajkiran as Niraipandiyan Thevar, Muthulakshmi's brother and Viruman's uncle
 Soori as Kuthukkal, Viruman's friend
 Karunas as Balu, Muthulakshmi's brother 
 Vadivukkarasi as Muniyandi's mother 
 R. K. Suresh as Soonapaana, the village rogue
 Vasumithra as Selvam, Viruman's first brother
 Manoj Bharathiraja as Muthukutty, Viruman's second brother
 Rajkumar as Ilango, Viruman’s third brother 
 G. M. Sundar as MLA Pathinettaampadiyaan
 Ilavarasu as Sangaiya, Thaenu's father
 Singampuli as Thalaiyaari, village assistant
 Arundhati as Selvam's wife and Theanu's sister
 Myna Nandhini as Muthukutty's wife 
 Indraja Shankar as Kolavikkal
 Indhumathi
 O. A. K. Sundar as Kuthalam Thevar, Muniyandi's brother
 Pattimandram Raja as Lawyer
 G. Gnanasambandam as Doctor
 Vaiyapuri as Auctioneer
 Aruldoss

Production

Development 
The film was announced on 6 September 2021 via a promotional poster, with official confirmation that film producer Suriya. Initially, Aparna Balamurali was announced to be playing the female lead, however she was replaced by Aditi Shankar, daughter of director S. Shankar, which marks her acting debut.

Filming 
Motion capture for Viruman begun on 17 September 2021. Muhurat shot and formal launch was done on 6 September 2021 in Theni, India. Principal photography began that day, as informed by the makers. On 22 December 2021, entire shooting of the film has been wrapped up.

Music

The music rights of the film are owned by Sony Music India. The first single titled "Kanja Poovu Kannala" was released on 25 May 2022.

Release

Theatrical 
Viruman was initially set to release on 31 August 2022, during Vinayagar Chaturthi. However it was later preponed and released theatrically on 12 August 2022, coinciding with Raksha Bandhan and Independence Day.

Home media 
The digital rights of the film have been acquired by Amazon Prime Video while the satellite rights of the film have been sold to Star Vijay. The film was digitally streamed on Amazon Prime Video on 11 September 2022.

Reception

Critical Response 
Viruman received mixed reviews from critics and audience. 

Janani K of India Today rated the film 2.5 out of 5 stars and wrote "Viruman could have been yet another template film with clichéd elements. However, it crumbles with its underwhelming screenplay". Lakshmi Subramanian of The Week rated the film 2 out of 5 stars and wrote "Viruman too talks only about the deep sense of casteism and family disputes still prevailing in the hinterland of south Tamil Nadu". Gautaman Bhaskaran of News 18 rated the film 1 out of 5 stars and wrote "Karthi was interesting in his 2007 debut, Paruthiveeran, but has somehow never managed to wean himself away from the same kind of portrayals, infused with rage and rancour, in his later outings". Kirubhakar Purushothaman of The Indian Express rated the film 2.5 out of 5 stars and wrote "Viruman doesn't make you feel much while watching it, nor leaves you with a lot of thoughts about parenting. It is largely a passable movie". Sowmya Rajendran of The News Minute rated the film 2.5 out of 5 stars and  stated "Most films on family feuds set in rural areas are ultimately about kudumba paasam. Viruman would have been interesting if it had broken out of the formula". M. Suganth of The Times of India gave the film’s rating 2 out of 5 stars and wrote "On the technical side, there is basic proficiency, but even these feel generic - Selvakumar SK's visuals have the oft-seen colour palette found in contemporary rural films while Yuvan Shankar Raja contributes with a couple of catchy songs and a score that just about works." Haricharan Pudipeddi of Hindustan Times after reviewing the film stated that "Viruman is the kind of film you don’t mind overseeing because it creates a festival-like experience that’s best enjoyed on the big screen." Srivatsan S of The Hindu after reviewing the film stated that "If at all there is a takeaway from Viruman, it is that we have finally found a formidable pair in Karthi and Raj for the Tamil remake of Ayyappanum Koshiyum." Sudhir Srinivasan of Cinema Express rated the film 2 out of 5 stars, stating that "Soon as you see an expansive setting (like an open field, an empty warehouse…), you know that a fight scene is incoming, and bad guys are going to bounce more times off the ground than a rubber ball." Behindwoods gave the film’s rating 2.5 out of 5, stating that "The performances led by Karthi, Yuvan's music, and the rooted nature make Viruman a watchable family drama." Ananda Vikatan rated the film 39 out of 100. Dinamalar rated the film 3 out of 5.

Box office 
On the first day of its release, the film grossed over 8.2 crores at the box office. After the first three days of its release, the film collected over 30 crores worldwide and grossed 25 crores in Tamil Nadu. On the third day of its release, the film grossed over 26 crores. On the first weekend of its release the film grossed over 30 crores, becoming one of the highest grossing Tamil films of the year. In Malaysia, it is also the first Tamil film to gross over 2.8 crores at the Malaysian-box office after six days of its release.

References

External links 
 

Films about siblings
2020s masala films
2020s Tamil-language films